Naval Hospital may refer to:

Hospitals in the United States

 Alameda Naval Hospital, California (1941-1975)
 Naval Hospital Camp Pendleton, Camp Pendleton, California
 Naval Hospital Lemoore, at Naval Air Station Lemoore, Lemoore Station, California
 Mound City Civil War Naval Hospital, Mound City, Illinois
 Naval Hospital Oakland, Oakland, California
 Bob Wilson Naval Hospital, San Diego, California
 Naval Hospital Jacksonville, at Naval Air Station Jacksonville, Florida
 Naval Hospital Pensacola, Florida
 Naval Hospital Corps School (1913–2011), Lake County, Illinois
 Bethesda Naval Hospital, Bethesda, Maryland
 Naval Hospital Boston Historic District, Chelsea, Massachusetts
 Naval Hospital Beaufort, South Carolina
 Naval Medical Center Portsmouth, Virginia, formerly known as Naval Hospital Portsmouth
 Naval Hospital Bremerton, Bremerton, Washington
 Naval Medical Center Camp Lejeune, North Carolina

World War II hospitals
 Naval Hospital Corona (1941–1949, re-opened for the Korean War), California
 Naval Convalescent Hospital, Santa Cruz (1943–1946), California
 Yosemite Naval Convalescent Hospital (1943–?) at the Ahwahnee Hotel, California
 San Leandro Naval Hospital (1944–1946), Oakland, California
 Naval Hospital Long Beach (1941-1950), now VA Long Beach Healthcare System
 Naval Convalescent Hospital Beaumont (1942–1945), California
 Naval Convalescent Hospital Arrowhead Springs (1942-1945)

Hospitals elsewhere
 Naval Hospital of Puerto Williams, Chile, Chile Navy, (1953- )
 Naval Hospital Yokosuka Japan
 U.S. Naval Hospital, Subic Bay, Philippines

See also
 Naval Medical Research Center, United States
 Royal Naval Hospital (disambiguation)
 United States Naval Hospital (disambiguation)